Sacred Games may refer to:

 Sacred Games (biography), a 1995 book by Gerald Jacobs
 Sacred Games (novel), a 2006 novel by Vikram Chandra.
 Sacred Games (TV series), a 2018 streaming television series by Netflix based on Chandra's novel
Sacred Games (soundtrack), soundtrack album of 2018 streaming television series

See also 
 Ancient Olympic Games, considered sacred by the ancient Greeks
 Sacred (video game)